Aciuroides insecta is a species of ulidiidae or picture-winged fly in the genus Aciuroides of the family Ulidiidae.

References

Ulidiidae
Diptera of South America
Insects described in 1914